Cho Byoung-se (born March 20, 1949) is a South Korean government official, economist and academic professor. He was a Senior Secretary to the Prime Minister of South Korea, a Chief of Protocol to the Prime Minister, Vice Minister, and Chair Director of a government owned corporation.

Education 
In February 1988 he graduated from Seoul National University, Korea with master's degree in Public Policy Making. In February 1994 he earned a PhD in Economics on Hanyang University.

Academic career 
 1993 - 1994 Research Advisor, KAIST (Korea Advanced Institute of Science & Technology), Korea
 1996 - 1997 Adjunct Professor, University of New South Wales (UNSW), Australia
 Mar. 2001–Present Professor, Hanyang University; Korea,
 Jan.2004 - Sep.2005 Professor, University of Pennsylvania, Taught “Korean Political Economy” and “North Korean Political Economy”
 Sep. 2007 - Jan. 2008, Professor, Tashkent State University of Oriental Studies; Uzbekistan
 Mar. 2011 - Jul. 2013 Exchange Professor, Chengchi University (NCCU); Taipei, Taiwan
 Oct. 2013 – until present Visiting Professor, Jagiellonian University, Kraków, Poland

Books 
 Understanding of Korean Politics, NCCU Textbook, 2012
 Understanding of Korean Economy, NCCU Textbook, 2012
 Song Taizu Zhao Guangyin (Korean), Taebong, 2011
 Hearing the Sound of Falling Rain over the Gourd Flower on the Fence, Maewon, 2010
 Those People Who Love Mountains (Korean), A Collection of Essays, Shinsin, 1999
 Korean Economy and Chinese Economy (Korean), Daewoong, 1994
 Youngdong, This Youngdong (Korean), Regional Research, Shinsin, 1990
 Footprints of Youngdong District (Korean), Regional Research, Shinsin, 1993

References

External links 
 https://web.archive.org/web/20140413142015/http://www.asiapacific.nccu.edu.tw/people/bio.php?PID=320

1949 births
Living people
Academic staff of Hanyang University
South Korean writers
Academic staff of Tashkent State University of Oriental Studies